Bodega is an unincorporated community and census-designated place (CDP) in Sonoma County in the U.S. state of California. The town had a population of 220 as of the 2010 Census.

Salmon Creek flows through the town.

History

The town of Bodega was known historically as Bodega Corners or Bodega Roads, to distinguish it from the Port of Bodega or Bodega Bay, as it is known today, which is about four miles from Bodega. Bodega and Bodega Bay are named for discoverer of the bay, Juan Francisco Bodega y Caudra, who first sailed into the harbor in 1775.  There were formerly two Coast Miwok villages in the area: one (called Kennekono) sited near the current town and another (called Suwutenne) further north. The first Europeans in the area were Russians who established temporary settlements at Bodega Bay and the Salmon Creek Valley, in the vicinity of Bodega, in 1809.

In 1843, Captain Stephen Smith established the first West Coast lumber mill near Bodega. Around the same time, John A. Sutter bought land from the Russians, an area that included Bodega. His land purchase included "some hunting rights, a small boat, several rusty cannons, and some old muskets." In 1859, shipbuilders constructed Saint Teresa of Avila Church.  Open from 1856 to 1967, Watson School, once served as Bodega's school, and is located in a Sonoma County Regional Parks Department historic park about 2 miles east of Bodega.

Geography
According to the United States Census Bureau, the CDP covers an area of 2.9 square miles (7.5 km2), all of it land. The Phacelia distans is known for blossoming in Bodega between April and June.

Demographics

The 2010 United States Census reported that Bodega had a population of 220. The racial makeup of Bodega was 209 (95.0%) White, 0 (0.0%) African American, 2 (0.9%) Native American, 2 (0.9%) Asian, 0 (0.0%) Pacific Islander, 0 (0.0%) from other races, and 7 (3.2%) from two or more races. Hispanic or Latino of any race were 9 persons (4.1%).

The Census reported that 220 people (100% of the population) lived in households, 0 (0%) lived in non-institutionalized group quarters, and 0 (0%) were institutionalized.

There were 117 households, out of which 16 (13.7%) had children under the age of 18 living in them, 43 (36.8%) were opposite-sex married couples living together, 5 (4.3%) had a female householder with no husband present, 7 (6.0%) had a male householder with no wife present.  There were 9 (7.7%) unmarried opposite-sex partnerships, and 1 (0.9%) same-sex married couples or partnerships. 51 households (43.6%) were made up of individuals, and 13 (11.1%) had someone living alone who was 65 years of age or older. The average household size was 1.88.  There were 55 families (47.0% of all households); the average family size was 2.55.

The population was spread out, with 25 people (11.4%) under the age of 18, 12 people (5.5%) aged 18 to 24, 43 people (19.5%) aged 25 to 44, 101 people (45.9%) aged 45 to 64, and 39 people (17.7%) who were 65 years of age or older.  The median age was 54.5 years. For every 100 females, there were 94.7 males.  For every 100 females age 18 and over, there were 101.0 males.

The homeowner vacancy rate was 1.5%; the rental vacancy rate was 0%.  137 people (62.3% of the population) lived in owner-occupied housing units and 83 people (37.7%) lived in rental housing units.

Economy

As of 1915, Bodega was serviced by Wells Fargo and Company, who provided express delivery service. Wells Fargo delivered fruits, vegetables, eggs, and butter to the region from Alameda County. In the late 1970s, the Soycrafters Association of North America was headquartered in Bodega. It was run by soy product innovator Larry Needleman. The area also has a history of creameries, making milk and butter. The Bodega Cooperative Creamery was located in Bodega as of 1922.

Farming continues in the area, including Salmon Creek Ranch, which raises livestock and sells organic products.
Bodega has a tourism industry, which includes the Sonoma Coast Villa, and art galleries and shops in the small "downtown" area.

Arts and culture

In the 1970s, Bodega was home to a doll museum.

In popular culture
In 1963, much of Bodega was used for exterior filming in Alfred Hitchcock's film, The Birds, where it was presented as the nearby shore village of Bodega Bay. Bodega's Potter School, now a private residence, was used as the Bodega Bay School in the movie; and Bodega's general store also appeared "as itself", though it has since been moved from its original site.

Government
In the California State Legislature, Bodega is in the 2nd Senate District and the 2nd Assembly District.

At the county level, Bodega is in Sonoma County's 5th supervisorial district.

Education
There is an elementary school in the nearby village of Bodega Bay but no educational facilities in Bodega itself.

Media

Infrastructure

Transportation
The main road through town is Bodega Highway, which runs east to Freestone and Sebastopol and south to State Route 1 less than a mile (1.6 km) away.  State Route 1 provides access to the neighboring towns of Bodega Bay and Valley Ford.

The Mendocino Transit Authority provides bus service to Bodega.  Routes 75 and 95 stop at Bodega two times a day. An eastbound one at 10:25 am, and the same one returning westbound at 4:55 pm.

Notable residents

Thomas Oliver Boggs was a resident for a brief period in Bodega, before leaving for New Mexico, where he witnessed the burial of Kit Carson. Boggs' papers are held in the collection of the Bancroft Library.

See also
Bodega Bay, California
West coast lumber trade

References

External links
Bodega Community Website

Census-designated places in California
Census-designated places in Sonoma County, California
Unincorporated communities in California
Unincorporated communities in Sonoma County, California